Sethenira is a genus of leaf-footed bugs in the family Coreidae. There are about five described species in Sethenira.

Species
These five species belong to the genus Sethenira:
 Sethenira ferruginea Stal, 1870
 Sethenira grossa Brailovsky, 1988
 Sethenira rufohumerata Brailovsky, 1988
 Sethenira testacea Spinola, 1837
 Sethenira uruguayensis Berg, 1892

References

Further reading

 

Articles created by Qbugbot
Coreini
Coreidae genera